The list of video games featuring Batman encompasses computer, mobile phone, and console systems since the 1980s, where Batman from DC Comics has any role appearances.

Standalone games

Related games

Mobile games

See also
 List of video games based on DC Comics

References

External links

UGO's World of Batman
Arkham Has Moved, a promotional site for the sequel to Batman: Arkham Asylum

 
Video games
 
Batman
Detective video games

sv:Batman (datorspel)